The 2009–10 Women's National Cricket League season was the 14th season of the Women's National Cricket League, the women's domestic limited overs cricket competition in Australia. The tournament started on 31 October 2009 and finished on 30 January 2010. The season saw the addition of the ACT Meteors, taking the number of teams up to six. Defending champions New South Wales Breakers won the tournament for the 12th time after finishing second on the ladder at the conclusion of the group stage and beating Victorian Spirit in the final.

Ladder

Fixtures

Final

Statistics

Highest totals

Most runs

Most wickets

References

External links
 Series home at ESPNcricinfo

 
Women's National Cricket League seasons
 
Women's National Cricket League